Wiska (Aymara for "wool rope", Hispanicized spelling Huisca) is a mountain in the Andes of Peru, about  high. It is situated in the Apurímac Region, Antabamba Province, Oropesa District, and in the Cotabambas Province, Challhuahuacho District.

References

Mountains of Peru
Mountains of Apurímac Region